The Women's 4 x 50 metre medley relay 20pts swimming event at the 2004 Summer Paralympics was competed on 24 September. It was won by the team representing .

Final round

Team Lists

References

W
2004 in women's swimming